Dansefeber is a Norwegian television reality program and dance competition airing on the TVNorge network. The show is a version of the US original version So You Think You Can Dance. Season two premiered with Merete Lingjærde, Geir Bie and Vibeke Sørlie as permanent judges and Henriette Lien returning to host. Contemporary dancer Hanna Mjåvatn was crowned Norway's Favourite Dancer and the top price of 500,000 norwegian kroner, as the first female dancer to win the competition in every version of the show. Runner-up were hip-hop dancer Eric Nærbø, with jazz dancer Michelle Purvis finishing 3rd, and Latin ballroom dancer Bjørn Holthe finishing 4th.

Audition

Cities 
Open auditions for this season were held in the following cities:
Oslo
Bergen
Trondheim

Format 
The format is the same as So You Think You Can Dance (US) season 2-present; the dancer could:
Be sent straight home, because the judges did not think the dancer was good enough
Be sent straight to the "Fever Days", same as Las Vegas Week in the US version
Be sent to the choreography round, where the dancer will be asked to learn a choreography later hi in the day, and based on that, the judges decides who will go through to the "Fever Days"

The Fever Days 
The Fever Days were held in Oslo. The "Fever Days" is the same as Las Vegas week in the US version, where the dancers will be asked to learn different styles of dance in a workshop. After all the challenges, the judges picks the top 20 finalists, 10 female and 10 male from all over Norway.

Finals

Elimination chart 

Contestants are in reverse chronological order of elimination.

†Mona Berntsen suffered an injury that resulted in her being unable to continue in the competition. She was medically withdrawn, and Michelle Purvis replaced her as she was the most recent female competitor eliminated. That meant Berntsen was able to try for the next season, which it was not going to be, but bigger, in So You Think You Can Dance (Scandinavia), which she won.

All shows

Audition 1 (Oslo) 
The first episode of Dansefeber was audition in Oslo.
Auditioners which got the top 20:
Hanna Mjåvatn (winner)
Eric Nærbø (runner-up)
Michelle Purvis (3rd place)
Bjørn Holthe (4th place)
Philip Olsen (top 6)
Alexandra Joner (top 6)
Ellen Dybvik (top 8)
Endre Jansen (top 12)
Mona Berntsen (top 12, winner of So You Think You Can Dance (Scandinavia)
Navid Rezvani (top 14)
Hugo Hagström (top 18)
Anett Amundsen (top 18)

Audition 2 (Bergen) 
The second episode of Dansefeber was audition in Bergen.
Auditioners which got to the top 20:
Ole Petter Knarvik (top 10)
Marit Halvorsen (top 10)
Anette Stokke (top 14)
Lars Olav Eltervaag (top 16)
Sara Einbu (top 16)
Trine Lise Akselsen (top 20)

Audition 3 (Trondheim) 
The third episode of Dansefeber was audition in Trondheim.
Auditioners which got to the top 20:
Vegard Kristiansen (top 8)
Chenno Tim (top 20)

The Fever Days 
The fourth episode of Dansefeber was the Fever Days in Oslo, which is the same as Las Vegas Week in the US version.

Week 1 (Top 20) 
The fifth episode of Dansefeber, was the first live-show, held in Lillestrøm Kultursenter in Oslo.

Musical guest: "Mor du e hott!"—Tungtvann
Solos:
Anette Stokke: "Smooth Criminal"—Michael Jackson
Hugo Hagström: "Labor Day (It's a Holiday)"—The Black Eyed Peas
Anett Amundsen: "Hanky Panky"—Madonna
Lars Olav Eltervaag: "Summertime"—Billy Stewart
Trine Lise Akselsen: "Wake Me Up Before You Go-Go"—Wham!
Chenno Tim: "Lose Control"—Missy Elliott (ft. Ciara & Fat Man Scoop)
Eliminated:
Trine Lise Akselsen
Chenno Tim
New partners:
None

Week 2 (Top 18) 
The sixth episode of Dansefeber, was the second live-show.

Solos:
Anett Amundsen: "Gabriel"—Lamb
Lars Olav Eltervaag: "Jump, Jive and Wail"—The Brian Setzer Orchestra
Anette Stokke: "Don't You Worry 'bout a Thing"—Stevie Wonder
Hugo Hagström: "All Nite (Don't Stop)"—Janet Jackson
Michelle Purvis: "Weapon of Choice"—Fatboy Slim
Ole Petter Knarvik: "Papa's Got a Brand New Bag"—James Brown
Eliminated:
Anett Amundsen
Hugo Hagström
New partners:
Anette Stokke and Lars Olav Eltervaag

Week 3 (Top 16) 
The seventh episode of Dansefeber, was the third live-show.

Solos:
Anette Stokke: "Ain't It Funny"—Jennifer Lopez
Lars Olav Eltervaag: "I Heard It Through the Grapevine"—Marvin Gaye
Sara Einbu: "Power"—Wade Robson
Navid Rezvani: "SexyBack"—Justin Timberlake
Mona Berntsen: "Ring the Alarm"—Beyoncé
Endre Jansen: "Ain't No Other Man"—Christina Aguilera
Eliminated:
Sara Einbu
Lars Olav Eltervaag
New partners:
Anette Stokke and Navid Rezvani

Week 4 (Top 14) 
The eighth episode of Dansefeber, was the fourth live-show.

Musical guest: "Fever"—Tone Damli Aaberge
Solos:
Anette Stokke: "Nasty"—Janet Jackson
Navid Rezvani: "Breaking the Habit"—Linkin Park
Michelle Purvis: "Say It Right"—Nelly Furtado
Ole Petter Knarvik: "Celebration"—Kool & the Gang
Ellen Dybvik: "Trust a Try"—Janet Jackson
Bjørn Holthe: "Tequila"—The Champs
Eliminated:
Anette Stokke
Navid Rezvani
New partners:
None. Now that only top 12 is remain, dancers pick their partners randomly from a hat.

Week 5 (Top 12) 
The ninth episode of Dansefeber, was the fifth live-show.

Solos:
Marit Halvorsen: "Mindfields"—The Prodigy
Endre Jansen: "Know the Ledge"—Eric B. & Rakim
Ellen Dybvik: "Get on the Good Foot"—James Brown
Philip Olsen: "I Got You (I Feel Good)"—James Brown
Michelle Purvis: "Long Way 2 Go"—Cassie
Eric Nærbø: "Gallery"—Mario Vazquez
Eliminated:
Michelle Purvis†
Endre Jansen
† Mona Berntsen was injured and could not perform next week. Then Michelle Purvis came into the competition again and competing next week instead of Berntsen. (The same happened almost like in So You Think You Can Dance season 4 when Jessica King was injured and Comfort Fedoke came in competing next week)

Week 6 (Top 10) 
The tenth episode of Dansefeber, was the sixth live-show.

Solos:
Marit Halvorsen: "I'm Really Hot"—Missy Elliott
Eric C. Nærbø: "Wanna Move"—P. Diddy (ft. Big Boi, Ciara & ScAr)
Ellen Dybvik: "Sir Duke"—Stevie Wonder
Ole Petter Knarvik: "Getaway"—Earth, Wind & Fire
Eliminated:
Marit Halvorsen
Ole Petter Knarvik

Week 7 (Top 8) 
The eleventh episode of Dansefeber, was the seventh live-show.

Solos:
Ellen Dybvik: "It's Like That"—Run-D.M.C. vs. Jason Nevins
Philip Olsen: "Colorblind"—Counting Crows
Michelle Purvis: "Grace Kelly"—Mika
Vegard Kristiansen: "I Question Mark"—Wade Robson
Eliminated:
Ellen Dybvik
Vegard Kristiansen

Dansefeber: The Easter Special 
It was made an Easter special episode this week, where we got to see un-watched auditions, plus the judges' favourite moments of the season so far. The host and the judges is on the mountain, eating Easter food, and discussing the top 6. The judges' favourite routines were seen one more time:
Merete Lingjærde: Hanna Mjåvatn and Philip Olsen (Modern; Choreographer: Sølvi Edvardsen)
Geir Bie: Michelle Purvis and Eric Nærbø (Rumba-inspired modern jazz; Choreographer: Jan Ivar Lund)
Vibeke Sørlie: Mona Berntsen and Ole Petter Knarvik (Hip-hop; Choreographer: Maxim)

Week 8 (Top 6/Semi-Final) 
The thirteenth episode of Dansefeber, was the eighth live-show. This show was the semi-final.

Group dance: "Don't Give Up"—Basement Jaxx (Contemporary; Choreographer: Tine Aspaas)
Musical guest: "Dodge It"—Samsaya
Solos:
Hanna Mjåvatn: "Canon in D"—Johann Pachelbel
Alexandra Joner: "Wind It Up"—Gwen Stefani
Eric C. Nærbø: "Give It to Me"—Timbaland (ft. Nelly Furtado & Justin Timberlake)
Philip Olsen: "Jazz Machine"—Black Machine
Eliminated:
Alexandra Joner
Philip Olsen

Week 9 (Top 4/Finale) 
The fourteenth episode of Dansefeber, was the ninth live-show. This show was the grand finale.

Group routines:
The b-boys of the season (Chenno Tim, Navid Rezvani, Endre Jansen and Ole Petter Knarvik): "Give It Up or Turnit a Loose"—James Brown (Breaking)
Top 20 (without top 4): "Water"—Ying Yang Twins (Hip-hop)
Musical guest:
"Leo"—Mira Craig (with guest dancers Ole Petter Knarvik and Navid Rezvani)
Solos:
Hanna Mjåvatn:
"Why Does My Heart Feel So Bad?"—Moby
Eric Nærbø (mix of three songs):
"Because of You"—Ne-Yo
"Come Thru"—DMX (ft. Busta Rhymes)
"Give It to Me"—Timbaland (ft. Nelly Furtado & Justin Timberlake)
Michelle Purvis (mix of two songs):
"Good Luck"—Basement Jaxx
"LoveStoned/I Think She Knows"—Justin Timberlake
Eliminated in order:
Bjørn Holthe (did not get the chance to perform a solo, since he didn't make it to the top 3)
Michelle Purvis
Eric Nærbø
Winner:
Hanna Mjåvatn

Contestants

Trine Lise Akselsen 
Trine Lise Akselsen is a ballroom dancer from Bergen, Norway. Her partner were Chenno Tim, and the first week, they got jazz, and got in the bottom three. Then Akselsen performed a jive solo, and got eliminated together with Tim.

Anett Amundsen 
Anett Amundsen is a jazz dancer. Her partner were Lars Olav Eltervaag, and the first week, they got salsa, and got in the bottom three. Then Amundsen performed a jazz solo, and both were safe. The second week, they got hip-hop, and also got in the bottom three. Then Amundsen performed a contemporary solo, and she got eliminated, but not Eltervaag.

Mona Berntsen 

Mona-Jeanette Berntsen is a hip-hop dancer from Oslo, Norway. She is a member of the dance group Cre-8. In Dansefeber season 2, her first partner were Endre Jansen, and the first week, they got afro, and were safe. The second week, they got lyrical jazz, and were also safe. But the third week, they got locking, and ended up in the bottom three. Then Berntsen performed a hip-hop solo, and both were safe. The fourth week, they got jive, and were safe. The fifth week, Berntsen got a new partner, Ole Petter Knarvik, and they got new style hip-hop. Then they were both safe. But, when they performed the routine, Berntsen hurt her knee, and couldn't perform the next weeks. Then Michelle Purvis, which was the most recent female eliminated dancer, came in instead of Berntsen. Berntsen was able to compete in So You Think You Can Dance (Scandinavia) the next year, which she won. Berntsen also attended the Dansefeber tour 2007.

Ellen Dybvik 
Ellen Dybvik is a ballerina. Her first partner were Bjørn Holthe, and the first week, they got hip-hop, and were safe. The second week they got contemporary jazz, and were also safe. The third week they got jazz, and were also safe. But the fourth week, they got hip-hop salsa, and got in the bottom three. Then Dybvik performed a jazzballet solo, and both were safe. The fifth week, Dybvik got a new partner, Philip Olsen, and they got musical, and both ended up in the bottom six. Then, Dybvik performed a jazzballet solo, and both were safe. The sixth week, Dybvik got Vegard Kristiansen as partner, and the styles disco and contemporary jazz, and Kristiansen were safe, but Dybvik ended up in the bottom four. Then, Dybvik performed a jazzballet solo, and were safe. The seventh week, Dybvik got Philip Olsen again as partner, and the styles hip-hop dancehall and musical, and both ended up in the bottom four. Then, Dybvik performed a funkjazzballet solo, and Olsen got through, but Dybvik got eliminated.

Sara Einbu 
Sara Kristine Einbu is a hip-hop dancer from Bergen, Norway. She is a member of the dance group Schang. In the competition, her partner were Navid Rezvani, and the first week, they got afro, and were safe. The second week, they got cha-cha and were also safe. But the third week, they got jazz, and ended up in the bottom three. Then, Einbu performed a popping solo, and Rezvani were safe, but Einbu got eliminated. Einbu got high fever when the live-shows started, but she would not stop continuing in the competition.

Hugo Hagström 
Hugo Hagström is a ballroom dancer from Sweden, living in Oslo, Norway. His partner were Anette Stokke, and the first week, they got salsa, and were crowned as one of the top 2 couples of the night, but ended up in the bottom three. Then, Hagström performed a funk solo, and both were safe. The second week, they got disco, and also got in the bottom three. Then, Hagström performed a funk solo, and Stokke were safe, but Hagström got eliminated. Later, Hagström attended the Dansefeber tour 2007.

Reference 

Dansefeber
2007 Norwegian television seasons